Tyler Derraugh (born July 7, 1986) is a Canadian middle-distance and mass start speed skater who compete at the World Cup level.

References

External links 
ISU profile
 Speed Skating Canada profile

1986 births
Canadian male speed skaters
Living people
Speed skaters from Winnipeg
World Single Distances Speed Skating Championships medalists